Nakhon Thai is a subdistrict in the Nakhon Thai District of Phitsanulok Province, Thailand.

Geography
Nakhon Thai lies in the Nan Basin, which is part of the Chao Phraya Watershed.

Administration
The following is a list of the subdistrict's mubans (villages):

Temples
The following is a list of temples in the Nakhon Thai subdisrict:
Wat Na Phra That in Ban Nuea is a wooden building built on top of old ruins of a former temple building. It has a historic statue of a Luang Phor Phet inside an iron cage.
Wat Nakhon Thai Wanaram (
Wat Klang Sri Phutararam is a temple with ornate murals and a statue of Phokunbangklangtao.
Wat Pawee Mok
Wat Nong Lan

References

Tambon of Phitsanulok province
Populated places in Phitsanulok province